The Mercedes-Benz M24 engine is a supercharged, 5.0-liter and 5.4-liter, straight-8 engine, designed, developed and produced by Mercedes-Benz; between 1934 and 1944.

Applications
Mercedes-Benz W31
Mercedes-Benz 500K
Mercedes-Benz 540K

References

Mercedes-Benz engines
Straight-eight engines
Engines by model
Gasoline engines by model